Gullbrandstorp is a locality situated in Halmstad Municipality, Halland County, Sweden, with 1,781 inhabitants in 2020.

References 

Populated places in Halmstad Municipality